Clanfield may refer to:

 Clanfield, Hampshire
 Clanfield, Oxfordshire